This article lists the winners and nominees for the Black Reel Award for Outstanding Cinematography. The award is given to the cinematographer of the nominated film. The category was first introduced at the 19th Annual Black Reel Awards where James Laxton took home the first award in this category for If Beale Street Could Talk.

Winners and nominees

2010s

2020s

Multiple nominations and wins

Multiple nominations

 2 nominations 
 Sean Bobbitt

References

Black Reel Awards